William Kexby  MA (aka William de Kexby; fl. 1376–1379) was a late 14th-century Master of University College, Oxford, England.

Kexby was a Fellow of University College and he subsequently became Master of the College. In 1379, he was Archdeacon of Cleveland.

See also
 Kexby, North Yorkshire

References 

Year of birth unknown
Year of death unknown
Fellows of University College, Oxford
Masters of University College, Oxford
Archdeacons of Cleveland
14th-century scholars
14th-century English Roman Catholic priests